2020 Remote Darts League, shortly RDL, was a darts tournament - the first edition in its history. The tournament was developed by Farawaysports, an organisation dedicated to providing quality remote sporting contests including pictures, data and odds, during the world-wide pandemic of COVID-19. Similar to the Premier League in terms of format, the Remote Darts League sees every player face off against each other with each player gaining points in order to play in finals night. James Richardson became the first winner, defeating Paul Hogan 10–3 in the final.

Format 

The RDL comprises 10 top WDF players competing over 10 days in a fast league format. Players all play each other once over nine nights with five matches taking place each evening. Each match will play out over a maximum of 12 legs with the first player to reach seven legs winning the fixture and picking up two league points. As its best of 12 legs this allows for the possibility of a match to be tied at 6-6, in this case each player will receive one point. After nine nights each player will have played each other and the four players with the highest number of league points will qualify for the final night showdown. On final night the Top 4 battle it out in two semi-finals and a grand final for the right to be crowned the first Remote Darts League champion. After a four-day break, the 10 players will compete again in the next leg of the Remote Darts League, RDL2.

Venues 

Due to the COVID-19 pandemic and regulations from the government, all players play from their home. All players have a webcam prepared in their home environment, through which it is possible to watch every thrown dart. The referee, Richard Ashdown, confirms the score. Viewers see both dartboards at the same time, along with the scoreboard and the referee.

Players 

The 10 WDF players have been chosen in advance including the former BDO World champion, John Walton or the finalist of the UK Open 2011 and European Championships 2012, Wes Newton.

League stage

18 April - Day 1

19 April - Day 2

20 April - Day 3

21 April - Day 4

22 April - Day 5

23 April - Day 6

24 April - Day 7

25 April - Day 8

26 April - Day 9

Playoff - 27 April

Table and streaks

Table 
Two points are awarded for a win and one point for a draw. When players are tied on points, leg difference is used first as a tie-breaker, after that legs won against throw and then tournament average.

After the nine rounds, top 4 players qualify for the semifinals, where the first will play with the fourth and the second with the third.

(Q) = Qualified For The Playoffs
(E) = Eliminated From Playoff Contention

Streaks

References

External links
 Remote Darts League, official website

2020 in darts
2020 in British sport